Martinroda is a municipality in the district Ilm-Kreis, in Thuringia, Germany. The former municipality Angelroda was merged into Martinroda in December 2019.

See also

References

Municipalities in Thuringia
Ilm-Kreis